Francis (Frank) Augustus Bevan (17 January 184031 August 1919) was a British heir and banker. He served as the chairman of Barclays Bank, a British multi-national financial institution, serving from 1896 to 1916.

Early life
Francis Augustus Bevan was born on 17 January 1840, the second son of Robert Cooper Lee Bevan (1809-1890). Bevan was educated at Harrow School, a private boarding school in North West London.

Career
He became a partner in Barclay, Bevan, Tritton and Co in 1859, and eventually succeeded his father as senior partner. In 1896, Barclays merged with a number of mostly private banks to become a joint stock enterprise. Bevan was the last senior partner of the private bank and the first chairman of the new bank, Barclay and Company Limited.

Under his leadership, Barclays became one of the Big Five UK banks. He remained a director until his death. He also served as Lord Lieutenant of the City of London, a JP, and as High Sheriff of Middlesex.

Personal life
He was married and widowed three times.

On 22 July 1862, he married Elizabeth Marianne Russell, the daughter of the politician Lord Charles Russell and Isabella Clarisa Davies. On 19 April 1866, he married Constance Hogg, the daughter of the politician Sir James Hogg, 1st Baronet and Mary Claudine Swinton. In 1875, he married Maria Trotter.

Until 1890, he lived at Ludgrove Hall, Cockfosters. Following his father's death in 1890, he moved to nearby Trent Park.

He was the churchwarden of Christ Church, Cockfosters, the church founded by his father.

His third son, Raymond Francis Bevan, was a cleric, vicar of St Lawrence, Thanet from 1907 to 1921.

His fourth son, Gerard Lee Bevan, was a leading financier and infamous fraudster.

Death
Bevan died in 1919.

References

1840 births
1919 deaths
People educated at Harrow School
Barclays people
Francis
British chairpersons of corporations
Chairmen of Barclays
High Sheriffs of Middlesex
English people of Welsh descent
Churchwardens
Ludgrove
Members of Middlesex County Council
19th-century British businesspeople